The 2013 BBVA Compass Bowl, the seventh edition of the game, was a post-season American college football bowl game, held on January 5, 2013 at Legion Field in Birmingham, Alabama as part of the 2012–13 NCAA Bowl season. The game, which was telecasted at 12:00 p.m. CT on ESPN, featured the University of Pittsburgh Panthers of the Big East Conference versus the University of Mississippi Rebels of the Southeastern Conference. This was Pittsburgh's third consecutive appearance in the game, as well as its final game as a member of the Big East before they join the Atlantic Coast Conference in 2013. The announced attendance for the game was a BBVA Compass Bowl record 59,135, eclipsing the previous attendance record of 42,610 in the 2010 edition.  The University of Mississippi defeated the University of Pittsburgh 38–17.

Teams

Ole Miss

Pittsburgh

Game summary

Statistics

References

BBVA Compass Bowl
Birmingham Bowl
Ole Miss Rebels football bowl games
Pittsburgh Panthers football bowl games
BBVA Compass Bowl